Michele Di Menna (born 1980) is a Canadian interdisciplinary artist who works with text, performance, sculpture and collage.

Biography 
Michele Di Menna was born in Vancouver, British Columbia. She attended the Emily Carr Institute of Art and Design in Vancouver and later attended Staatliche Hochschule für Bildende Künste Städelschule (2005-2010), in Frankfurt Germany.

Reception
Frieze.com has described Di Menna's artistic practice as "a persistently process-based approach (that) is self-referential."

Select group exhibitions 

 2019: Marabu: Badischer Kunstverein, Karlsruhe, Germany
 2018: Schmalz: Guimarães, Vienna, Austria
 2018: Landfall and Departure: Epilogue (Listening to the Sea): Nanaimo Art Gallery, Nanaimo, British Columbia
 2017: in awe: cur. by Melanie Ohnemus, Kunsthalle Exnergasse, Vienna, Austria
 2016: Ein Schelm: wer Böses dabei denkt : cur. by Stephanie Siedel and Fanny Gonella, Kuenstlerhaus Bremen, Bremen, Germany
 2016: Rage Farmer Rage Profiteer: Beautiful Gallery, Chicago, United States
 2015: Dérive Dérivée:Fondation CAB (CAB Art Center), Brussels, Belgium
 2015: Spielraum: Städsschen Galerie Nordhorn, Nordhorn, Germany
 2014: Jahre Halle fuer Kunst Lueneburg, Lueneburg, Germany
 2014: A Soft Tragedy: Kinderhook and Caracas, Berlin, Germany
 2013: The only performances that make it all the way/ Kunstlerhaus: Halle fur Kunst and Medien, Graz
 2012: the Avantgarde: Deep Cuts:  Marres Centre for Contemporary Culture, London, England
 2011: Beautiful Weather: Foksal Gallery Foundation, Warsaw 
 2011: based in Berlin, Berlin
 2010: Maladresses ou la Figure de l'Idiot: Institute of Social Hypocrisy, Paris, France
 2009: The Perpetual Dialogue:  Andrea Rosen Gallery, New York City, United States 
 2009: Ginger Goodwin Way: Or Gallery, Vancouver, British Columbia, Canada
 2008: The Great Transformation, Art and Tactical Magic: MARCO, Museo de Arte Contemporánea, Monterrey, Mexico
 2008: The Great Transformation, Art and Tactical Magic: Frankfurter Kunstverein, Frankfurt am Main, Germany

Solo exhibitions 

 2019: The bells put out their tongues: The Beach Office, Berlin, Germany
 2016: This piece of cod passeth understanding: Ashley, Berlin, Germany
 2010: Art Statement with Galerie Kamm at Art 41 Basel

Residencies 
Michele was a resident at Western Front from Oct 2- Nov 11, 2013 and later completed a residency at Fogo Island Arts in 2015.

References 

1980 births
Living people
Artists from Vancouver
Interdisciplinary artists
21st-century Canadian sculptors
Canadian women sculptors
Canadian women artists